The 2008 French Road Cycling Cup is the 17th edition of the French Road Cycling Cup. It started on February 24 with the Tour du Haut Var and finished on October 9 with Paris–Bourges. Jérôme Pineau of  won the overall competition, despite not winning any of the races.

Events

External links
 Coupe de France Standings 

French Road Cycling Cup
French Road Cycling Cup
2008 in French sport